Egbert Roelof "Ep" Wieldraaijer (31 March 1927 – 16 February 2017) was a Dutch politician. A member of the Labour Party, he served in the House of Representatives from 1963 to 1974. During this term, he also served as a member of the European Parliament for the Netherlands from 1973 to 1974. Beginning in 1978, Wieldraaijer served a ten-year term as the Mayor of Avereest. He was born in Borne, Overijssel.

Wieldraaijer died on 16 February 2017 in Enschede, at the age of 89.

References

External links
 Ep Wieldraaijer at parlement.com 

1927 births
2017 deaths
Labour Party (Netherlands) MEPs
Mayors in Overijssel
Members of the House of Representatives (Netherlands)
MEPs for the Netherlands 1958–1979
People from Borne, Overijssel